Ek Hi Maqsad is a 1988 Bollywood drama film directed by Pravin Bhatt. The film stars Om Puri, Divya Rana and Danny Denzongpa in the lead roles.

Cast
Om Puri as Dr. Ram Kumar Verma
Divya Rana as Indu Verma 'Dimpy'
Raj Kiran as Raj
Danny Denzongpa as Inspector  Deepak
Rakesh Bedi as Stage Actor Preetam
Satish Shah as Inmate at C.T. Mental Hospital
Kim as Item Dancer

Music
The music of the movie was composed and directed by Pankaj Udhas, while the songs were sung by Asha Bhosle and Pankaj Udhas.

Track list

References

External links

1980s Hindi-language films
Indian drama films
1988 drama films
1988 films
Hindi-language drama films